General Sir Frederick Campbell (1860-1943) was a British officer who is probably his most famous for the Younghusband Expedition to Tibet in 1903-1904.

Early life
A student of Wellington College, Berkshire.

Military career

Frederick Campbell went to the Royal Military Academy Sandhurst and after he graduated he was deployed to India where he took part in Hazara Expedition of 1888 and the Chitral Relief Expedition in 1895. While based in the North-West Frontier Province he served in battles against local tribesmen in 1897 (Siege of Malakand), 1897-1898 (Operations in Mamund country).

WWI
During WWI religious leaders in the Ottoman Empire called for a holy war against the British. This inspired tribesmen of the North-West Frontier Province to revolt. During this time Campbell commanded the 1 Peshawar Division between 1915 and 1919.

Bibliography
Notes

References 
 - Total pages: 2,756
 - Total pages: 262

1860 births
1943 deaths
Graduates of the Royal Military College, Sandhurst
People educated at Wellington College, Berkshire
British Army generals of World War I